Stiff upper lip is a colloquial expression referring to fortitude in the face of adversity.

Stiff upper lip may also refer to:

 Stiff Upper Lip (album), an album by AC/DC
 "Stiff Upper Lip" (AC/DC song), the title song
 Stiff Upper Lip World Tour, a concert tour
 Stiff Upper Lip Live, a DVD
 "Stiff Upper Lip" (Gershwin song), a song by George and Ira Gershwin
 Stiff Upper Lips, a 1997 British comedy film
 Stiff Upper Lip, a song by Mr Hudson from the album Straight No Chaser

See also
 Stiff Upper Lip, Jeeves, a novel by P. G. Wodehouse